Medialization may refer to:

 Mediatization (media), how mass media influence other sectors of society
 Laryngoplasty, vocal fold surgery